Gregory B. Gill, Jr., is an American attorney and judge.  He is currently serving as a Wisconsin circuit court judge in Outagamie County, since 2011, but was elected in April 2021 to the Wisconsin Court of Appeals, with a term set to begin August 1, 2021.

Biography

Gill earned his bachelor's degree from University of Wisconsin–Madison, and went on to obtain his J.D. from Marquette University Law School.  He began his legal career as an assistant district attorney in Outagamie County, Wisconsin, and went on to clerk for Judge William C. Griesbach of the United States District Court for the Eastern District of Wisconsin.  He then joined his family's law firm, known as Gill & Gill, focused on labor and employment law.

In 2011, Gill was appointed Wisconsin circuit court judge for Outagamie County's Branch 4 court, by Governor Scott Walker.  He went on to win election to a full term in 2012 and was re-elected in 2018, both times without facing an opponent.

In December 2020, following the announcement that Judge Mark Seidl would retire at the end of his term, Judge Gill announced his candidacy for Wisconsin Court of Appeals in the northern District III court.  In the April general election, Gill defeated his opponent, Rick Cveykus, with 55% of the vote.

References

External links
 
 Gill & Gill, S.C.
 Campaign website (Archived February 23, 2021)

  

Date of birth unknown
Year of birth unknown
Living people
University of Wisconsin–Madison alumni
Marquette University Law School alumni
Wisconsin Court of Appeals judges
Wisconsin state court judges
21st-century American judges
Year of birth missing (living people)